Gerard Anthony Brownlee (born 4 February 1956) is a New Zealand politician of the New Zealand National Party. He has been a Member of Parliament since 1996, was Leader of the House, Minister for Canterbury Earthquake Recovery and Minister of Foreign Affairs in the Fifth National Government, and served as his party's deputy leader from November 2003 until November 2006, and again from July until November 2020.

He was born and grew up in Christchurch where he worked as a teacher before being elected to Parliament at the 1996 general election as the MP for Ilam. He held that electorate until the 2020 general election, when he was elected as a list MP. In October 2022, Brownlee, became Father of the House, having served continuously in the House of Representatives since the 1996 general election.

Early life and family
Brownlee was born in Christchurch to Leo (a saw miller, who died in 1989) and Mary Brownlee. He is the eldest of five children. His uncle, Mark Brownlee, represented New Zealand in rowing at the Summer Olympic Games in 1964 and 1968, and his cousin Scott Brownlee (Mark's son), represented New Zealand in rowing at the Olympics in 1992, 1996, and 2000.

A Roman Catholic, he attended St Bede's College where he twice failed to gain University Entrance. After leaving high school, he worked in his family's timber business and received training in carpentry. After qualifying as a builder, he retrained as a teacher and taught woodwork, technical drawing and Māori, over a period of twelve years, at Ellesmere College, and at his alma mater, St Bede's. He stood as a candidate for the Canterbury Regional Council in 1992 on the Citizens' Association ticket, but was unsuccessful.

Member of Parliament

In the 1993 election, Brownlee stood as the National Party candidate in the Sydenham electorate, where he campaigned unsuccessfully against Jim Anderton, the Alliance leader. In the 1996 election he contested the nearby seat of Ilam, and won by a comfortable margin. He remained the MP for Ilam since that point until losing his seat in the 2020 election. Before that his closest brush with defeat occurred in the 2002 election wherein he had a majority of 3,872 votes – 11.52%.

Brownlee's roles as an MP have included serving as the National Party's Junior Whip, shadow Leader of the House, and as the Party spokesperson on superannuation, energy, transport, local government, Māori affairs, state-owned enterprises, state services, and ACC. He was Don Brash's Deputy Leader from 2003–2006, and served as a minister and Leader of the House in the Fifth National Government.

In October 2022, Brownlee became Father of the House, having served continuously in the House of Representatives since the 1996 general election.

Fifth Labour Government, 1999–2008
Brownlee received criticism during the 1999 election campaign when he ejected Neil Able, a 60-year-old Native Forest Action campaigner, from the National Party's 1999 election campaign launch. The ejection took place with what many, including watching journalists, considered excessive force. Neil Able started civil assault proceedings against Brownlee, seeking damages of $60,000. In 2002, a District Court judge found in favour of Mr Able that Brownlee had "used excessive and unnecessary force on Mr Abel when he tried to remove him from a staircase handrail". Brownlee was ordered to pay Neil Able $8,500 in damages. Brownlee later sought unsuccessfully to have $48,000 of his legal fees reimbursed by the Government.

Brownlee challenged the vacant deputy leadership of the National Party in 2001, but was defeated by Bill English. English eventually succeeded to the leadership later that year. However, by 2003 Brownlee was seen by Labour Party MP Phil Goff and Scoop columnist Paulo Politico as a potential challenger to English's leadership. English was eventually replaced as National Party leader by former Reserve Bank Governor Don Brash. Brownlee was thought to be a possible deputy leader to Brash but declined to pursue the position, which went to Nick Smith.

Shortly after his election, however, Smith opted to take two weeks of stress leave, saying that the protracted leadership disputes had exhausted him. When Smith returned to Parliament, Brownlee challenged him for the deputy leadership. Informed of the challenge, Smith resigned, and on 17 November 2003 Brownlee won the caucus vote unopposed. Initially, Smith alleged that while he was on stress leave, "a campaign to oust me was conducted in the media while I was under the leader's instructions to make no comment." Audrey Young wrote in the New Zealand Herald that Brownlee and Murray McCully were rumoured to have been behind the campaign to oust Smith as deputy leader.

After becoming a deputy leader, Brownlee continued his confrontational and colourful style of political debate. Following the controversy surrounding Brash's Orewa Speech of 27 January 2004, Brownlee became the National Party's spokesman for Maori Affairs in place of Georgina te Heuheu, who resigned from the position after refusing to endorse Brash's comments. Brownlee's approach to this portfolio involved criticising the government's policies regarding perceived special treatment for Māori, an issue at the core of National's 2005 election manifesto.

When Brash resigned as National Party Leader in November 2006, Brownlee was reported as "probably" considering a bid to remain in the deputy leadership; however, he stepped aside in place to allow former leader Bill English to take the deputy leadership and was appointed the third-ranked National Party MP by new party leader John Key.

Fifth National Government, 2008–2017
Following the election of the Fifth National Government in November 2008, Brownlee was appointed a member of the Executive Council of New Zealand and to Cabinet as Minister of Economic Development, Minister of Energy and Resources and as Associate Minister for the Rugby World Cup. He also became the Leader of the House, making him responsible for the schedule of Government business, allocating time for non-governmental and opposition business to be presented to the house and announcing the Business Statement for the Parliamentary sitting dates to the house and its members.

Minister of Energy and Resources
In August 2009, Brownlee was criticised by Forest and Bird Spokesperson Kevin Hackwell for playing down government discussions to possibly allow more mining within conservation areas. Hackwell was reported as stating that "If the Government's to go down this line they could be buying a fight with the people of the Coromandel, with the people of New Zealand generally, who have put these areas aside and want them protected for their conservation values". The New Zealand mining industry was reported as welcoming the move.

In early December 2009, Forest and Bird released a leaked document that included the proposal to remove part of the conservation status of Mount Aspiring National Park to allow mining. The result of the controversy was that the government decided not to explore considerations amongst significant debate on the issue in the House, in submissions to the Select Committees and within the National Party's own parliamentary caucus.

Minister for Canterbury Earthquake Recovery

As the Government's most senior Christchurch-based MP, Brownlee led the Government's work in earthquake recovery after the 2010, 2011 earthquakes and 2016 earthquakes. When Bill English became Prime Minister, Brownlee succeeded Murray McCully as Minister of Foreign Affairs.

On 14 September 2010, Brownlee introduced the Canterbury Earthquake Response and Recovery Act 2010 into the house with leave to pass the legislation in one sitting. This Bill was passed by the time the House adjourned at 10.02 pm.

Brownlee had little sympathy for attempts to preserve heritage buildings, saying not long after the 2011 quake: "My absolutely strong position is that the old dungers, no matter what their connection, are going under the hammer."

In 2012, it was reported that the idea of using part of Christchurch's residential red zone for an international rowing regatta course known as East Lake had found the support of Brownlee as Earthquake Recovery Minister.

In September 2012, Brownlee accused residents in Christchurch's newly created TC3 zone of "carping and moaning" for comments they made in a survey conducted by the main local newspaper. The comments were about perceived inaction by the authorities, including the government. He apologised soon after.

On the withdrawal Brownlee stated "I suspect few New Zealanders knew the country had such considerable mineral potential before we undertook this process, and I get a sense that New Zealanders are now much more aware of that potential". He went on that it might contribute to economic growth and further stated that "New Zealanders have given the minerals sector a clear mandate to go and explore that land, and where appropriate, within the constraints of the resource consent process, utilise its mineral resources for everyone's benefit". An additional announcement from Conservation Minister Kate Wilkinson pronounced that future National Park land would receive protections, stating that, "This is an added layer of protection for New Zealand's most highly valued conservation land..."

Minister of Transport
In March 2012, Brownlee made controversial comments about Finland in a parliamentary session. Rejecting a New Zealand Labour Party plan to model the economy on Finland, he said Finland: "has worse unemployment than us, has less growth than us, can hardly feed the people who live there, has a terrible homicide rate, hardly educates its people, and has no respect for women." Finnish Foreign Minister Erkki Tuomioja, said that Finland would not take any action as the comments were clearly a device for internal politics rather than an attack on Finland. He continued to say: "I doubt he even knows where Finland is."

In November 2014 Brownlee was fined $2000 by New Zealand's Civil Aviation Authority for a breach of airport security that occurred at Christchurch Airport on 24 July 2014. An official inquiry found that Brownlee and two of his aides had evaded airport security screening by entering a departure lounge through an exit door while in a rush to board a domestic flight.

2013 funeral of Margaret Thatcher
In April 2013, Brownlee was selected to represent New Zealand in London at the funeral of former British Prime Minister Margaret Thatcher.

Same-sex marriage legislation
In April 2013, Brownlee voted against the Marriage (Definition of Marriage) Amendment Bill, a bill allowing same-sex couples to marry in New Zealand.

Minister of Foreign Affairs

In May 2017, less than a week after being appointed as Foreign Minister, Brownlee was publicly corrected by the Prime Minister, Bill English, after claiming that a New Zealand-sponsored United Nations Security Council Resolution on Israel (about settlements in occupied territories) was "premature". The Prime Minister said Brownlee was "still getting familiar" with the language used by his predecessor, Murray McCully, who had authorised the sponsorship of the resolution. Responding to questions in Parliament on Brownlee's behalf, Deputy Prime Minister Paula Bennett commented that Brownlee's use of the word "premature" was because the Government "would have liked to give Israel notice of the resolution, and our part in that, but did not."

English said he had confidence that Brownlee was clear on New Zealand's position now, a position that had not changed since the Government had chosen to push through the resolution. Brownlee had been a Cabinet minister at the time; however, the decision to co-sponsor the resolution (described by McCully and Bennett as being in line with New Zealand's "long-standing position") had not gone to Cabinet.

Sixth Labour Government, 2017–present
From 2018 to 2020, Brownlee served in Opposition as Shadow Leader of the House, and was the National Party Spokesperson for Disarmament, NZSIS, and GCSB. He was the Deputy Chairperson on the Privileges, Standing Orders, and Foreign Affairs, Defence and Trade Select Committees, as well as a member of the Business Committee and the Parliamentary Service Commission.

On 14 July 2020, Brownlee was elected by the National Party parliamentary caucus as the Deputy Leader of the National Party following a leadership election held after the resignation of Party Leader Todd Muller that same day. Judith Collins was elected as the leader of the National Party.

In August 2020, Brownlee was widely criticised during the COVID-19 pandemic for comments he made that were widely interpreted to be promoting misinformation and conspiracy theories regarding the NZ Government response to the pandemic. In particular, his comments were considered to imply that the Government was withholding information about confirmed cases, without providing any evidence that this was the case. Brownlee was also accused of attacking the integrity of independent public servants and promoting the propagation of misinformation.

During the 2020 New Zealand general election, Brownlee lost his seat of Ilam to Labour candidate Sarah Pallett by a final margin of 3,463 votes. Dominic Harris of news website Stuff described it "perhaps the most unlikely of election night coups". Despite this defeat, Brownlee returned to Parliament due to his high ranking on the National Party list.

On 6 November 2020, Brownlee announced his resignation as deputy leader of National. He was succeeded by Shane Reti.

Brownlee announced on 2 August 2022 that he would seek re-election at the 2023 New Zealand general election, although would not attempt to win back Ilam, instead opting to contest as a list only candidate, indicating he may become Speaker of the House should National form a Government following the election.

In September 2022, Browlee was criticised for his response to the United Nations Xinjiang Report in saying that China is "dealing with a terrorist problem".

See also
List of foreign ministers in 2017

References

External links

Profile at National party

|-

|-

|-

|-

|-

|-

|-

|-

|-

|-

|-

|-

1956 births
Living people
New Zealand National Party MPs
New Zealand Roman Catholics
New Zealand schoolteachers
People from Christchurch
People educated at St Bede's College, Christchurch
People associated with the 2011 Christchurch earthquake
Members of the New Zealand House of Representatives
Unsuccessful candidates in the 1993 New Zealand general election
New Zealand MPs for Christchurch electorates
New Zealand defence ministers
21st-century New Zealand politicians
Candidates in the 2017 New Zealand general election
New Zealand foreign ministers
Deputy opposition leaders